The Bulloch County School District is a public school district in Bulloch County, Georgia, United States, based in Statesboro. It serves the communities of Brooklet, Hopeulikit, Portal, Register, and Statesboro.

Schools
The Bulloch County School District has nine elementary schools, four middle schools, and three high schools.

Elementary schools 
Brooklet Elementary School
Julia P. Bryant Elementary School
Langston Chapel Elementary School
Mattie Lively Elementary School
Mill Creek Elementary School
Nevils Elementary School
Portal Elementary School
Sallie Zetterower Elementary School
Stilson Elementary School

Middle schools
Langston Chapel Middle School
Portal Middle/High School
Southeast Bulloch Middle School
William James Middle School

High schools
Portal Middle/High School
Southeast Bulloch High School
Statesboro High School

References

External links

School districts in Georgia (U.S. state)
Education in Bulloch County, Georgia